English singer, songwriter, musician and record producer Sampha has released one studio album, two extended plays, and five singles. He joined label Young in 2009 as an intern, which led to his signing. He released his EPs Sundanza and Dual in 2010 and 2013, respectively. He released his debut album Process in 2017 and was met with critical acclaim, eventually winning the 2017 Mercury Prize.

Sampha is also known for his collaborative work with other artists, as a producer, vocalist and musician. He has appeared on recordings by Beyoncé, Drake, Florence + the Machine, Frank Ocean, Kanye West, Kendrick Lamar, Robyn, Solange, and among many others. He is also known for frequently collaborating with English musician and producer SBTRKT.

Albums

Extended plays

Singles

As lead artist

As featured artist

Other charted songs

As lead artist

As featured artist

Guest appearances

Remixes

Other appearances

Notes

References 

Discographies of British artists